Evagoras or Euagoras may refer to:

People 
Evagoras (mythology) for Greek mythological characters named Evagoras
Evagoras I, king of Salamis in Cyprus, 411–374 BC
 Evagoras II, king of Salamis in Cyprus, 361–351 BC
 Evagoras Pallikarides (1938–1957), Cypriot EOKA fighter
 Evagoras Hadjifrangiskou (born 1986), Cypriot footballer

Other uses 
 Evagoras, an oration by Isocrates
 Euagoras (bug), a genus of assassin bugs
 Evagoras Amiandos, Cypriot football team
 Evagoras Avgorou, Cypriot football team
 Evagoras Pallikarides Agion Trimithias, Cypriot football team
 Evagoras Paphos, Cypriot football team